"Why Do I Have to Choose" is a song written and recorded by American country music artist Willie Nelson.  It was released in May 1983 as the first single from his album Take It to the Limit.  The song reached number 3 on the Billboard Hot Country Singles chart and number 1 on the RPM Country Tracks chart in Canada.

Charts

Weekly charts

Year-end charts

References

1983 singles
Willie Nelson songs
Songs written by Willie Nelson
Song recordings produced by Chips Moman
Columbia Records singles
1983 songs